The 2018 United States Senate election in Maine was held on November 6, 2018, alongside a gubernatorial election, U.S. House elections, and other state and local elections. Incumbent Independent Senator Angus King won reelection to a second term.

The primary election was held on June 12, 2018.

The U.S. Senate elections were conducted with ranked-choice voting, as opposed to a simple plurality, after Maine voters passed a citizen referendum approving the change in 2016 and a June 2018 referendum sustaining the change. Ranked choice voting was used in the primary elections as well. The first round of each election saw a majority and the instant runoff did not need to be carried out.

Background
A part of New England, Maine was once a bastion of the Republican Party, and was one of two states to vote against Franklin Roosevelt all four times he ran for president. Lyndon Johnson won the state in 1964, and Hubert Humphrey carried it in 1968 before the state reverted to form and reestablished a GOP voting streak that lasted until the 1990s. With the GOP progressively becoming more culturally conservative, the state began moving toward the Democrats, and Bill Clinton carried it in 1992. Clinton's win established a Democratic winning streak that lasted until Donald Trump won an electoral vote from the state's second congressional district in 2016 despite losing the rest of the state.

The state has a tradition of electing various independent candidates to high office, such as Angus King, who served as governor of the state from 1995 to 2003. In 2012, King's decision to run for the Senate seat being vacated by Republican Olympia Snowe dramatized the battle for the Senate, as he left open whether he would caucus with the Republicans or the Democrats. He eventually decided to caucus with the Democrats and has established a center-left voting record.

Independents
King said his reelection plans would not be affected by treatment for prostate cancer, which he announced he had on June 22, 2015.

Candidates

Declared
 Angus King, incumbent U.S. Senator

Republican primary
On January 12, 2015, Maine Governor Paul LePage made a statement on Howie Carr's radio program that he might run for U.S. Senate against King, citing King's switching his endorsement in the 2014 gubernatorial election from independent candidate Eliot Cutler to Democratic candidate Mike Michaud as a "horrible thing to do". The next day, LePage said his comment was a joke, though on an August 25, 2015 appearance on Carr's program, he said he was "very strongly" considering running, citing King's caucusing with Senate Democrats. LePage also criticized King for his involvement in the Maine wind energy industry, saying King "ripped us off by $104 million during his eight years as governor – he ripped us off, royally, and I can’t wait until 2018 because I’m thinking that’s the guy I'm going after." A spokesman for King dismissed LePage's criticism.

On May 10, 2016, LePage announced at a town hall meeting in Oakland that he would run against King unless he was hired by the Donald Trump administration. On May 10, 2017, LePage decided not to run; his spokesman said he preferred to focus on being governor. On July 20, 2017, LePage again said he "might" challenge King. Trump personally encouraged LePage to run and offered his endorsement. LePage did not file to run by the March 15, 2018 deadline.

Eric Brakey's campaign successfully contested 258 signatures to Max Linn's petitions to appear on the primary ballot, which meant that Linn had 10 fewer signatures than the 2,000 needed to be on the ballot. Maine Secretary of State Matthew Dunlap then declared Linn ineligible to be a candidate, although it was too late to remove Linn's name from the ballot. Voters were informed of Linn's status when they voted, and any votes cast for him were counted as blanks. Nevertheless, Linn's campaign was active on Twitter and placed campaign signs along roads in Maine. Linn signs were also seen in New Hampshire, including in Dover. Dover city officials said they would remove the signs upon request if Linn's campaign did not remove them, because Linn is not a candidate in a New Hampshire election and because the signs were placed improperly. Linn appealed the decision to disqualify him to U.S. District Court in Portland, but Judge Nancy Torresen rejected Linn's request for an injunction to bar Dunlap from informing voters he is ineligible. Linn subsequently announced he would run against U.S. Senator Susan Collins in the 2020 Republican primary election.

Candidates

On the ballot
 Eric Brakey, State Senator

Declared ineligible
 Max Linn, financial planner, Reform nominee for Governor of Florida in 2006 and Democratic candidate for FL-10 in 2008

Declined
 Mark Holbrook, clinical psychologist and nominee for ME-01 in 2016 (ran for ME-01)
 Paul LePage, Governor

Endorsements

Results

Democratic primary
The Democratic primary race initially included both teacher Zak Ringelstein and homebuilder Benjamin Pollard, but Pollard withdrew to run as an Independent two days after Ringelstein announced a list of 16 endorsements from Democratic state legislators. Ringelstein was the only major-party candidate for Senate to be a dues-paying member of the Democratic Socialists of America in 2018.

Candidates

Declared
Zak Ringelstein, teacher and founder of UClass

Withdrawn
Benjamin Pollard, homebuilder and primary and write-in candidate for the U.S. Senate in 2012

Declined
 Cynthia Dill, former state senator and nominee for the U.S. Senate in 2012
 Diane Russell, former state representative (ran for governor)

Endorsements

Results

Libertarian primary

Candidates

Failed to make ballot
Chris Lyons, write-in candidate for the U.S. Senate in 2014

General election

Candidates
 Angus King, incumbent (I)
 Eric Brakey, state senator (R)
 Zak Ringelstein, teacher and founder of UClass (D)

Endorsements

Predictions

Polling

with Paul LePage

Results 

Counties that flipped from Independent to Republican
 Piscataquis (largest municipality: Dover-Foxcroft)
 Somerset County (largest municipality: Skowhegan)

See also
United States Senate elections, 2018
Maine gubernatorial election, 2018

References

External links
Candidates at Vote Smart
Candidates at Ballotpedia
Campaign finance at FEC
Campaign finance at OpenSecrets

Official campaign websites
Eric Brakey (R) for U.S. Senate
Angus King (I) for U.S. Senate
Zak Ringelstein (D) for U.S. Senate

2018
Maine
United States Senate